Fang Zong'ao (1884 – 19 February 1950) was a late Qing dynasty scholar; a well known economist and jurist in the early Republic of China era, and a professor in economics and law.

Fang was born in Puning, Guangdong Province, China, in 1884. In 1903, Fang went to Tokyo Toa Kogahuin]] (東亜同文書院) for study. In 1905, Fang returned to his home town Puning after he graduated from the college and established a teachers' college in Puning. In 1908, Fang was granted a scholarship from Qing dynasty government and went to Japan again for his studies. After graduating from Yamaguchi Business School in Yamaguchi Prefecture Fang was admitted to Meiji University. Fang graduated from Meiji University in 1914 and married a Japanese noble's descendant, Koga Yasuhisa's daughter Koga Masako, a student at Tsuda College. Fang returned to China after the wedding. About a year after his return, Fang left his hometown Puning for Beijing to pursue his career.

During the time he stayed in Japan, Fang was appointed as a Political Affairs Director of the Tokyo Branch of the Progressive Party of the Republic of China.

Shortly after settling in Beijing, Fang was introduced by the Chinese High Commissioner to Tokyo (Wang Da-xie, who later became the Foreign Affairs Minister) to work at the Reserve Bank of China as a principal auditor. Fang spent his spare time teaching economics courses at several universities as a part-time professor. Soon, he became a full-time professor at Zhongguo University (University of China){{|zh|中國大學}}, Peking University and {{|zh|朝陽大學}}.

In 1937, the Republic of China Provisional Government was established in Beijing. Fang was appointed as the Vice Minister of the Ministry of Education and Secretary General of the Legislation Council of the Provisional Government. When Minister Tang Er-he  (汤尔和) was in the hospital in 1939, Fang served as the Acting Minister until Tang's death in 1940. Later, in 1940, when the Republic of China Nanjing National Government was established in Nanjing, Fang was appointed as the Vice Minister of Education of the North China Political Affairs Commission. During that period, Fang re-established the universities in Northern China to provide opportunities for students to continue their studies in Japanese-occupied regions. Fang also established the Law School of Peking University, and he was appointed as the first Head of the school. Fang was also selected as a board member of the China Federal Reserve Bank.

Fang died on 19 February 1950 in Beijing at the age of 66.

Family
Fang's father was Fang Mei-feng. Fang had five sons: Fang Jisheng (方纪生), Fang Shiao Tzu  (方孝慈), (Japanese: Hideo - 秀夫), Fang (Victor) Tse Tzu (方则慈), Fang Hong Tzu, and Fang Shao Tzu  (方绍慈), and three daughters: Fang Xiu Ching (方秀卿 (Hedi Pinheiro), Fang Wen Ching and Fang Li Ching  (方丽卿).

References

External links
方眉峰公永思录 
中国近現代人物名號大辭典

1884 births
1950 deaths
Republic of China economists
Educators from Guangdong
Academic staff of Peking University
Politicians from Jieyang
Republic of China politicians from Guangdong
Economists from Guangdong
Chinese university and college faculty deans
Business school deans